Manuel Pedro Gomes (born 16 October 1941 in Torres Novas, Santarém) is a Portuguese retired football defender and manager.

Playing career
Gomes spent his entire career with Sporting Clube de Portugal, going on to appear in 516 matches over 13 seasons (youth, friendlies and official), eighth-best at the time of his retirement. He was a member of the team that won the UEFA Cup Winners' Cup in 1963–64.

In 1970, Gomes won the second Primeira Liga championship of his career, the first with his active participation. He retired in June 1973 at the age of 31, having earned nine caps for Portugal during six years; his debut came on 31 May 1964 in a friendly against Argentina, in Rio de Janeiro (0–2 loss).

Coaching career
Gomes took up coaching immediately after retiring, a career which would last more than three decades. In the top division he was in charge of Clube Oriental de Lisboa, S.C. Farense, C.S. Marítimo, U.D. Leiria, C.F. Os Belenenses, Rio Ave F.C. and Sporting.

Precisely with his only club as a player, Gomes served his last spell in the top tier: having started the 1984–85 season as assistant to John Toshack, he took the reins of the team in the last two matches, winning one and losing another in an eventual runner-up finish behind FC Porto.

Before signing with the Lisbon side, Gomes worked as C.D. Nacional manager, being responsible for the acquisition of future Sporting legend Oceano.

Honours

Player
Primeira Liga: 1965–66, 1969–70
Taça de Portugal: 1962–63, 1970–71, 1972–73; Runner-up 1969–70, 1971–72
UEFA Cup Winners' Cup: 1963–64

Manager
Segunda Liga: 1976–77, 1980–81

See also
List of one-club men

References

External links

1941 births
Living people
Portuguese footballers
Association football defenders
Primeira Liga players
Sporting CP footballers
Portugal international footballers
Portuguese football managers
Primeira Liga managers
Liga Portugal 2 managers
C.S. Marítimo managers
S.C. Farense managers
Rio Ave F.C. managers
Associação Académica de Coimbra – O.A.F. managers
U.D. Leiria managers
C.F. Os Belenenses managers
C.D. Nacional managers
Sporting CP managers
S.C. Olhanense managers
U.F.C.I. Tomar managers
S.U. Sintrense managers
People from Torres Novas
Sportspeople from Santarém District